Bani Tak (also Romanized as Banī Tāk and Bonī Tāk; also known as Binitak, Mentūq, Mintug, and Mintugi) is a village in Qaleh Hamam Rural District, Salehabad County, Razavi Khorasan Province, Iran. At the 2006 census, its population was 1,336, in 273 families.

See also 

 List of cities, towns and villages in Razavi Khorasan Province

References 

Populated places in   Torbat-e Jam County